Black Creek Township may refer to the following townships in the United States:

 Black Creek Township, Mercer County, Ohio
 Black Creek Township, Luzerne County, Pennsylvania